Röfors is a locality situated in Laxå Municipality, Örebro County, Sweden with 207 inhabitants in 2010.

References

External links

Populated places in Örebro County
Populated places in Laxå Municipality